Amblyseius gruberi is a species of mite in the family Phytoseiidae.

References

gruberi
Articles created by Qbugbot
Animals described in 1989